The Turkish Cucumbers (German: Die türkischen Gurken) is a 1962 West German comedy film directed by Rolf Olsen and starring Gunther Philipp, Oskar Sima and Susi Nicoletti.

The film's sets were designed by the art directors Hertha Hareiter and Otto Pischinger. It was shot at the Bavaria Studios in Munich.

Synopsis
A fruit and vegetable wholesaler who does a great deal of business with the Middle East is disturbed to discover that one of his clients has gifted him a harem. He tries to keep this secret from his wife by pretending that the new arrivals are Turkish cucumbers, but she becomes increasingly suspicious.

Cast

References

Bibliography 
 Chrys Ingraham. White Weddings: Romancing Heterosexuality in Popular Culture. Routledge, 1999.

External links 

1962 films
1962 comedy films
German comedy films
West German films
1960s German-language films
Films directed by Rolf Olsen
Bavaria Film films
Films shot at Bavaria Studios
1960s German films